The Crișul Alb (Romanian), (Hungarian: Fehér-Körös) is a river in western Romania, in the historical region of Transylvania, and in south-eastern Hungary (Békés County).

Its source is in the southern Apuseni Mountains (Romanian: Munții Apuseni). It flows through the towns Brad, Ineu, Chișineu-Criș in Romania, and Gyula in Hungary. Crossing the border of Hungary, the river, now called Fehér-Körös, joins the Fekete-Körös (Crișul Negru) a few kilometres north from Gyula to form the river Körös (Criș) which ultimately flows into the Danube.

Towns and villages
The following towns and villages are situated along the river Crișul Alb, from source to mouth. 
In Romania: Brad, Baia de Criș, Hălmagiu, Gurahonț, Dieci, Sebiș, Bocsig, Ineu, Șicula, Chișineu-Criș.
In Hungary: Gyula, Doboz.

Tributaries
The following rivers are tributaries to the river Crișul Alb:

Left: Valea Laptelui, Plai, Valea Satului, Bucureșci, Luncoiu, Țebea, Birtin, Vața, Prăvăleni, Valea Mare, Valea Rea, Sighișoara, Mustești, Bodești, Almaș, Chisindia, Cleceova, Hodiș, Potoc, Trei Holâmburi, Gut, Cigher, Valea Nouă Chișer.
Right: Artan, Brad, Junc, Ribița, Baldovin, Obârșa, Ociu, Bănești, Leasa, Valea de la Lazuri, Tăcășele, Gruieț, Zimbru, Feniș, Crocna, Dumbrăvița, Craicova, Topasca, Sebiș.

The Canalul Morilor, an irrigation canal, runs parallel to the Crișul Alb through the lowland area between Buteni and Pilu.

References

Rivers of Romania
Rivers of Hungary
 
Rivers of Hunedoara County
Rivers of Arad County
International rivers of Europe
Brad, Hunedoara